The Napier Deltic engine is a British opposed-piston valveless, supercharged uniflow scavenged, two-stroke diesel engine used in marine and locomotive applications, designed and produced by D. Napier & Son. Unusually, the cylinders were disposed in a three-bank triangle, with a crankshaft at each corner of the triangle.

The term Deltic (meaning "in the form of the Greek letter (capital) delta") is used to refer to both the Deltic E.130 opposed-piston, high-speed diesel engine and the locomotives produced by English Electric using these engines, including its demonstrator locomotive named DELTIC and the production version for British Railways, which designated these as (TOPS) Class 55.

A single, half-sized, turbocharged Deltic power unit also featured in the English Electric-built Type 2 locomotive, designated as the Class 23. Both locomotive and engine became better known as the "Baby Deltic".

History and design
The Deltic story began in 1943 when the British Admiralty set up a committee to develop a high-power, lightweight diesel engine for motor torpedo boats. Hitherto in the Royal Navy, such boats had been driven by petrol engines, but their highly flammable fuel made them vulnerable to fire, unlike diesel-powered E-boats. A patent for an engine, similar in complexity, but with four lines of pistons, not just three, was filed in 1930 by Wifredo Ricart, linked to Alfa-Romeo, and to the Spanish INI truck maker Pegaso Pat ES0118013.

Until this time, diesel engines had poor power-to-weight ratios and low speed. Before the war, Napier had been working on an aviation diesel design known as the Culverin after licensing versions of the Junkers Jumo 204. The Culverin was an opposed-piston, two-stroke design. Instead of each cylinder having a single piston and being closed at one end with a cylinder head, the Jumo-based design used an elongated cylinder containing two pistons moving in opposite directions towards the centre. This obviates the need for a heavy cylinder head, as the opposing piston filled this role. On the downside, the layout required separate crankshafts on each end of the engine that must be coupled through gearing or shafts. The primary advantages of the design were uniflow breathing and a rather "flat" engine.

The Admiralty required a much more powerful engine, and knew about Junkers' designs for multicrankshaft engines of straight-six and diamond forms. The Admiralty felt that these would be a reasonable starting point for the larger design that it required. The result was a triangle, the cylinder banks forming the sides, with crankshafts at each corner connected by phasing gears to a single output shaft—effectively three separate V-12 engines. The Deltic could be produced with varying numbers of cylinders; 9 and 18 were the most common, having either three or six banks of cylinders, respectively. In 1946, the Admiralty placed a contract with the English Electric Company, parent of Napier, to develop this engine.

One feature of the engine was the way that crankshaft-phasing was arranged to allow for exhaust port lead and inlet port lag. These engines are called "uniflow" designs, because the flow of gas into and out of the cylinder is one way, assisted by blowers to improve cylinder exhaust scavenging. The inlet/outlet port order is In/Out/In/Out/In/Out going around the triangular ring (i.e. the inlet and outlet manifold arrangements have C3 rotational symmetry).

Earlier attempts at designing such an engine met with the difficulty of arranging the pistons to move in the correct manner, for all three cylinders in one delta, and this was the problem that caused Junkers Motorenbau to leave behind work on the delta-form while continuing to prototype a diamond-form, four-crankshaft, 24-cylinder Junkers Jumo 223. Mr. Herbert Penwarden, a senior draughtsman with the Admiralty Engineering Laboratory, suggested that one crankshaft needed to revolve anticlockwise to achieve the correct piston-phasing, so Napier designers produced the necessary gearing so one of them rotated in the opposite direction to the other two.

Being an opposed-piston design with no inlet or exhaust valves, and no ability to vary the port positions, the Deltic design arranged each crankshaft to connect two adjacent pistons operating in different cylinders in the same plane, using "fork and blade" connecting rods, the latter an "inlet" piston used to open and close the inlet port, and the former an "exhaust" piston in the adjacent cylinder to open and close the exhaust port. This would have led the firing in each bank of cylinders to be 60° apart, but arranging that each cylinder's exhaust piston would lead its inlet piston by 20° of crankshaft rotation was adopted. This allowed the exhaust port to be opened well before the inlet port, and allowed the inlet port to be closed after the exhaust port, which led to both good scavenging of exhaust gas and good volumetric efficiency for the fresh air charge. This required the firing events for adjacent cylinders to be 40° apart. For the 18-cylinder design, firing events could be interlaced over all six banks. This led to the even, buzzing exhaust note of the Deltic, with a charge ignition every 20° of crankshaft revolution, and a lack of torsional vibration, ideal for use in mine-hunting vessels. The 9-cylinder design, having three banks of cylinders, has its crankshafts rotating in the opposite direction. The exhaust lead of 20° is added to the 60° between banks, giving firing events for adjacent cylinders in the same bank 80° apart. Interlacing firing events over all three banks of cylinders still leads to an even buzzing exhaust note, and charge ignition occurring every 40° of crankshaft revolution with consequent reduction of torsional vibration.

Although the engine was cylinder-ported and required no poppet valves, each bank had a camshaft, driven at crankshaft speed. This was used solely to drive the fuel-injection pumps, each cylinder having its own injector and pump, driven by its own cam lobe.

Uses

Naval service 

Development began in 1947 and the first Deltic model was the D18-11B, produced in 1950. It was designed to produce  at 2000 rpm for a 15-minute rating; the continuous rating being  at 1700 rpm, based on a 1000-hour overhaul or replacement life. By January 1952 six engines were available, enough for full development and endurance trials. A captured German E-Boat S212 was selected as it was powered by Mercedes-Benz diesels with approximately the same power as the 18-cylinder Deltics. When two of the three Mercedes-Benz engines were replaced, the compactness of the Napier engines was graphically illustrated—they were half the size of the original engines and approximately one fifth the weight.

Proving successful, Deltic Diesel engines became a common power plant in small and fast naval craft. The Royal Navy used them first in the  fast attack craft. Subsequently they were used in a number of other smaller attack craft. Being largely of aluminium construction, their low magnetic signature allowed their use in mine countermeasures vessels and the Deltic was selected to power the s. These versions are de-rated to reduce engine stress.

Deltic Diesels served in MTBs and PT boats built for other navies. Particularly notable was the Norwegian Tjeld or Nasty class, which was also sold to Germany, Greece, and the United States Navy. Nasty-class boats served in the Vietnam War, largely for covert operations.

Smaller nine-cylinder Deltic 9 engines were used as marine engines, notably by minesweepers. The Ton-class vessels were powered by a pair of Deltic 18s and used an additional Deltic 9 for power generation for their magnetic influence sweep. The Hunt class used three Deltic 9s, two for propulsion and again one for power generation, but this time with a hydraulic pump integrated to power bow-thrusters for slow-speed manœuvring, until a refurbishment programme by BAE Systems, that ran from 2010 to 2018, replaced the Deltic with Caterpillar CAT C32 engines in the eight remaining commissioned Royal Navy vessels.

Railway use 

The "Deltic" engines were used in two types of British rail locomotive: the 1961–62 built class 55 and the 1959 built class 23. These locomotive types were known as "Deltics" and "Baby Deltics", respectively.

The Class 55 used two D18-25 series II type V Deltic engines: mechanically blown 18-cylinder engines each rated at  continuous at 1500 rpm.

Six out of the original 22 "Deltic" locomotives survive, four of which have, at various times since 1996, returned to work on the main line, operating both service trains and charter trains. D9000 "Royal Scots Grey", the doyen of the class, was returned to main line serviceable status in 1996 and continued to work throughout the UK for nearly twenty years. Following a power unit failure this locomotive was fitted, for a time, with an ex-Norwegian Navy T18-37K type, after various modifications were cleverly designed to make the new unit compatible.

Fire department use
The New York City Fire Department used a Napier Deltic engine to power their one-of-a-kind "Super Pumper System". This was a very-high-volume trailer-mounted fire pump with a separate tender.

Reliability in service 
While the Deltic engine was successful in marine and rail use and very powerful for its size and weight, it was a highly strung unit, requiring careful maintenance. This led to a policy of unit replacement rather than repair in situ. Deltic engines were easily removed after breakdown, generally being sent back to the manufacturer for repair, although after initial contracts expired both the Royal Navy and British Railways set up their own workshops for overhauls.

Turbo-compound Deltic 
The "E.185" or "Compound Deltic" turbo-compound variant was planned and a single prototype was built in 1956 and tested in 1957. This capitalised on Napier's experience with both the "Nomad" and its increasing involvement with gas turbines. It used the Deltic as the gas generator inside a gas turbine, with both a twelve-stage axial compressor and a three-stage gas turbine. Unlike the Nomad, this turbine was not mechanically coupled to the crankshaft, but merely drove the compressor. It was hoped that it would produce 6,000 horsepower, with fuel economy and power-to-weight ratio "second to none". Predictions by the engineers closely connected with it were that connecting rod failure would be the limit on this power, failing at around 5,300 bhp. On test it actually produced 5,600 bhp before throwing a connecting rod through the crankcase just as predicted. Naval interest had waned by 1958 in favour of the pure gas turbine, despite its heavier fuel consumption, and no further development was carried out.

Comparable engines 
 Junkers Jumo 223
 Zvezda M503
 Achates Power
 Fairbanks Morse 38 8-1/8 diesel engine

See also 
 Deltic Preservation Society

References

Further reading

External links 

 Deltic technical details
 The Deltic Preservation Society
 Hunt Class – Deltic-powered Mine Countermeasure Vessel
 Deltic Animations – 3-D animations of the piston motion in the Deltic engine
  – rebuilding of one of D9016 Gordon Highlander's engines after an exhaust silencer fire in 1999

 
Napier engines
Piston engine configurations
Piston ported engines
Diesel locomotive engines
Marine diesel engines
Two-stroke diesel engines
Opposed piston engines
Diesel engines by model
Deltic